Parietal (literally: "pertaining or relating to walls") is an adjective used predominantly for the parietal lobe and other relevant anatomy

Parietal may also refer to:

Human anatomy

Brain 

The parietal lobe is found in all mammals. The human brain has a number of connected, related, and proximal suborgans and bones which contain the "parietal" in their names.
Inferior parietal lobule, below the horizontal portion of the intraparietal sulcus and behind the lower part of the postcentral sulcus
Parietal operculum, portion of the parietal lobe on the outside surface of the brain
Parietal pericardium, double-walled sac that contains the heart and the roots of the great vessel
Posterior parietal cortex, portion of parietal neocortex posterior to the primary somatosensory cortex
Superior parietal lobule, bounded in front by the upper part of the postcentral sulcus
Parietal branch of superficial temporal artery, curves upward and backward on the side of the head
Parietal-temporal-occipital (PTO), includes portions of the parietal, temporal, and occipital lobes
 Parietal bone, of the skull
Parietal foramen (disambiguation)
Parietal eminence, external surface of the parietal bone

Other 

 Parietal cell, in the stomach
Parietal placentation, refers to the formation, type and structure, or arrangement of placentas
Parietal pleura, attached to the wall of the thoracic cavity

Non-human anatomy 

Parietal callus, feature of the shell anatomy of some groups of snails
Parietal eye, "third eye" of some animal species
Parietal scales, the scales on the head of the snake
Parietal wall, part of the margin of the aperture of a snail shell
The neck frill on the skulls of dinosaurs of the suborder Marginocephalia

Other 

Parietal art, art on natural cave surfaces